Dan Rhodes (born 1972) is an English writer, possibly best known for the novel Timoleon Vieta Come Home (2003), a subversion of the popular Lassie Come Home movie. He is also the author of Anthropology (2000), a collection of 101 stories, each consisting of exactly 101 words. In 2010 he was awarded the E. M. Forster Award.

Biography
Rhodes grew up in Devon, and graduated in Humanities from the University of Glamorgan (now the University of South Wales) in 1994, returning in 1997 to complete an MA in Creative Writing. Don't Tell Me the Truth About Love was written at this time. He has held a variety of jobs, including stockroom assistant for Waterstone's, barman in his parents' pub, and a teacher in Ho Chi Minh City. He has also worked on a fruit and vegetable farm and is still employed as a postman.

Following the publication of his second book, Rhodes's frustration with the publishing industry led him to announce his retirement from writing, though he later said, "I haven't really given up. I'm certainly not making any more grand pronouncements. I was just sick of the business and wanted out. Not just the publishers; everyone around me." 

Rhodes was included on Granta's Best of Young British Novelists list in 2003, to his own bemusement and frustration, partly because of Granta's selection methods ("It's one thing to judge a writer by stuff they've written, but to judge them on stuff they're going to write is lunacy") but also because some of the others on the list failed to respond to his request to sign a joint statement protesting the Iraq War.

In 2014, Rhodes self-published the novel When the Professor Got Stuck in the Snow, a "rural farce" about a visit to an obscure English village by a fictional Richard Dawkins, stating that he wanted to get the book out faster than conventional publishing allowed. Traditional publishers were loath to publish the novel for fear of legal action from Professor Richard Dawkins, who is parodied in it. Rhodes appealed repeatedly to Dawkins, a defender of satire and free speech, for permission to "publish and be damned" but received no response. The novel was republished by Aardvark Bureau in October 2015.

In 2021, Lightning Books published his novel Sour Grapes, a satire on the literary world set at a rural book festival.

Rhodes is married with two children.

Bibliography

Collections
 Anthropology: And a Hundred Other Stories (2000)  
 Don't Tell Me the Truth About Love (2001) 
 Marry Me (2013)

Novels
 Timoleon Vieta Come Home (2003)  
 The Little White Car (under the pen name Danuta de Rhodes) (2004) 
 Gold (2007) 
 Little Hands Clapping (2010)  
 This Is Life (2012) 
 When the Professor Got Stuck in the Snow (2014, self-published limited edition; 2015 formal publication by Aardvark Bureau) 
 Sour Grapes (2021)

References

External links
 Dan Rhodes Official Site
 Dan Rhodes - The SRB Interview
 A writer's life: Dan Rhodes from The Telegraph
 Of dogs and men: Interview with Dan Rhodes
 Canongate author page
 

1972 births
21st-century British novelists
Alumni of the University of Glamorgan
Living people
People from Buxton
Writers from Devon
British male novelists
21st-century British male writers
21st-century pseudonymous writers